Elisa Tavárez (1879–1960) was a Puerto Rican pianist.

Early years
Elisa Tavárez Colón was born in Ponce, Puerto Rico, to the "father of the dance" Manuel Gregorio Tavárez and Elisa Colón Colón

Training and career
Tavárez studied music education in Spain under Pilar de la Mora at the Madrid Conservatory, and always won first place in her concerts and auditions. She was invited to perform before the Queen of Spain, also earning well-deserved applause. After returning to Puerto Rico where she also presented concerts, she presented additional concerts in Central America, Cuba, and the United States.

Accolades
She is recognized in Ponce at the Park of Illustrious Ponce Citizens.

See also

 List of Puerto Ricans

References

1879 births
1960 deaths
Puerto Rican pianists
Musicians from Ponce